Otava is a major village in Mikkeli (until 2001 Mikkelin maalaiskunta), Eastern Finland. With the population of 2000 it is the largest urban area in the surrounding areas of Mikkeli. In 1889, one of the main railways in Finland, the Savonia railway, and a sidetrack to Otava harbour were built through Otava, although trains do not stop there anymore. Also, highway 5 goes by the village.

Villages in Finland